The CIF San Francisco Section (CIF-SF), frequently shortened to SFS or just SF, is the governing body of high school sports for school for what was originally the San Francisco Unified School District. It is one of ten sections that comprise the California Interscholastic Federation (CIF). The SFS is also known under the league name Academic Athletic Association, and is the only CIF section not divided into several leagues. While the league currently includes ICA Cristo Rey and Lycee Francais, most other parochial schools located within the borders of San Francisco; Archbishop Riordan High School, Sacred Heart Cathedral Preparatory and Saint Ignatius College Preparatory (members of the West Catholic Athletic League in the CIF Central Coast Section); and Lick-Wilmerding High School (member of the Bay Counties League West in the CIF North Coast Section).  Sacred Heart Cathedral, Saint Ignatius, and Lick-Wilmerding were all previous members of the CIF SF Section before joining their current CIF Sections.

Schools
The league is responsible for athletics between the public high schools in San Francisco, California and has grown in scope to encompass two SFUSD overseen charter schools and two private schools (as well as middle school athletics) within the district:
The Academy - San Francisco (located at the former J. Eugene McAteer High School campus) known as Academy 
Balboa High School known as Balboa
Phillip & Sala Burton High School (located at the former Woodrow Wilson High School campus) known as Burton
Galileo Academy of Science and Technology known as Galileo
ICA Cristo Rey (all girls private school) known as ICA
June Jordan School for Equity known as Jordan
KIPP San Francisco College Preparatory (charter school) known as KIPP
City Arts and Leadership Academy (charter school) (currently located within the James Denman Middle School campus) known as CAL
Lincoln High School known as Lincoln
Lowell High School known as Lowell
Lycee Francais de San Francisco (private school) known as Lycee Francais
Thurgood Marshall Academic High School known as Marshall
Mission High School known as Mission
John O'Connell High School of Technology known as O'Connell
San Francisco International High School known as SFI
Raoul Wallenberg Traditional High School known as Wallenberg
Washington High School known as Washington

History
The league started in 1912 to provide a competitive track and field program between the local schools.  The schools at that time were:
Lick-Wilmerding High School, Lowell, St. Ignatius College Preparatory, Mission, San Francisco Poly, High School of Commerce, Cogswell Polytechnical College and Humboldt Evening High School

References

External links
 Complete list of annual champions in CIFSF

California Interscholastic Federation sections